Drhovle is a municipality and village in Písek District in the South Bohemian Region of the Czech Republic. It has about 600 inhabitants.

Administrative parts
The municipality is made up of villages of Brloh, Chlaponice, Drhovle Ves, Drhovle Zámek, Dubí Hora, Mladotice and Pamětice.

References

Villages in Písek District